Smilax is a genus of about 300–350 species, found in the tropics and subtropics worldwide. In China for example about 80 are found (39 of which are endemic), while there are 20 in North America north of Mexico. They are climbing flowering plants, many of which are woody and/or thorny, in the monocotyledon family Smilacaceae, native throughout the tropical and subtropical regions of the world. 
Common names include catbriers, greenbriers, prickly-ivys and smilaxes. Sarsaparilla (also zarzaparrilla, sarsparilla) is a name used specifically for the Jamaican S. ornata as well as a catch-all term in particular for American species. Occasionally, the non-woody species such as the smooth herbaceous greenbrier (S. herbacea) are separated as genus Nemexia; they are commonly known by the rather ambiguous name carrion flowers.

Greenbriers get their scientific name from the Greek myth of Crocus and the nymph Smilax. Though this myth has numerous forms, it always centers around the unfulfilled and tragic love of a mortal man who is turned into a flower, and a woodland nymph who is transformed into a brambly vine.

Description 

On their own, Smilax plants will grow as shrubs, forming dense impenetrable thickets. They will also grow over trees and other plants up to 10 m high, their hooked thorns allowing them to hang onto and scramble over branches. The genus includes both deciduous and evergreen species. The leaves are heart shaped and vary from 4–30 cm long in different species.

Greenbrier is dioecious. However, only about one in three colonies have plants of both sexes. Plants flower in May and June with white/green clustered flowers. If pollination occurs, the plant will produce a bright red to blue-black spherical berry fruit about 5–10 mm in diameter that matures in the fall.

Taxonomy 

The genus has traditionally been considered as divided into a number of sections, but molecular phylogenetic studies reveals that these morphologically defined subdivisions are not monophyletic. Subdivision is best considered in terms of clades (A–D), corresponding to biogeography, with the main divisions being Old World (clades C, D) and New World (clade B) with the exception of S. aspera, that appears to be sister to all other species (clade A) and has a tri-continental disjunction.

Section Smilax includes "woody", prickly vines of temperate North America, for example cat greenbrier (S. glauca) and common greenbrier (S. rotundifolia). Section Nemexia includes unarmed herbaceous plants of temperate North America, for example "carrion flowers" like the smooth herbaceous greenbrier (S. herbacea). Section Heterosmilax represents a previous separate genus that was found to be embedded within Smilax, and was reduced to a section within it.

List of selected species 

 Smilax aberrans Gagnep.
 Smilax aculeatissima Conran
 Smilax amblyobasis K.Krause
 Smilax ampla Warb. ex K.Krause
 Smilax anceps Willd.
 Smilax anguina K.Krause
 Smilax annulata Warb. ex K.Krause
 Smilax aquifolium Ferrufino & Greuter
 Smilax arisanensis Hayata
 Smilax aristolochiifolia Mill. – American sarsaparilla 
 Smilax aspera L. – Mediterranean smilax, common smilax, rough smilax
 Smilax aspericaulisWall. ex A.DC. 
 Smilax assumptionis A.DC. 
 Smilax astrosperma F.T.Wang & Tang
 Smilax auriculata Walter
 Smilax australis R.Br. – lawyer vine, barbwire vine, wait-a-while (Australia)
 Smilax azorica H.Schaef. & P.Schönfelder
 Smilax bapouensis H.Li
 Smilax basilata F.T.Wang & Tang
 Smilax bauhinioides Kunth 
 Smilax bella J.F.Macbr.
 Smilax biflora Siebold ex Miq.
 Smilax biltmoreana (Small) J.B.Norton ex Pennell
 Smilax biumbellata T.Koyama
 Smilax blumei A.DC.
 Smilax bockii Warb.
 Smilax bona-nox L. – saw greenbrier
 Smilax borneensis A.DC. 
 Smilax bracteata Presl
 Smilax brasiliensis Sprengel. 
 Smilax californica (A.DC.) A.Gray 
 Smilax calophylla Wall. ex A.DC. 
 Smilax cambodiana Gagnep.
 Smilax campestris Griseb.
 Smilax canariensis Willd.
 Smilax canellifolia Mill.
 Smilax celebica Blume
 Smilax chapaensis Gagnep.
 Smilax china L.
 Smilax chingii F.T. Wang & Ts.Tang
 Smilax cinnamomea Desf. ex A.DC. 
 Smilax cissoides M.Martens & Galeotti 
 Smilax cocculoides Warb.
 Smilax cognata Kunth
 Smilax compta (Killip & C.V.Morton) Ferrufino
 Smilax corbularia Kunth
 Smilax cordato-ovata Rich.
 Smilax cordifolia Humb. & Bonpl. ex Willd.
 Smilax coriacea Spreng.
 Smilax cristalensis Ferrufino & Greuter
 Smilax cuprea Ferrufino & Greuter
 Smilax cuspidata Duhamel
 Smilax cyclophylla Warb.
 Smilax darrisii H.Lév.
 Smilax davidiana A.DC.
 Smilax densibarbata F.T.Wang & Tang
 Smilax discotis Warb.
 Smilax domingensis Willd.
 Smilax ecirrhata (Engelm. ex Kunth) S.Wats.
 Smilax elastica Griseb. 
 Smilax elegans Wall.
 Smilax elegantissima Gagnep.
 Smilax elmeri Merr.
 Smilax elongatoumbellata Hayata
 Smilax emeiensis J.M.Xu
 Smilax erecta Merr.
 Smilax excelsa L.
 Smilax extensa A.DC.
 Smilax ferox Wall. ex Kunth
 Smilax flavicaulis Rusby
 Smilax fluminensis Steud.
 Smilax fooningensis F.T.Wang & Tang
 Smilax gagnepainii T.Koyama
 Smilax gigantea Merr.
 Smilax gigantocarpa Koord. 
 Smilax glabra Roxb. – chinaroot, 
 Smilax glauca Walter – cat greenbrier, glaucous greenbrier
 Smilax glaucochina Warb.
 Smilax glyciphylla Sm. – sweet sarsaparilla, native sarsaparilla (Australia)
 Smilax goyazana A.DC. 
 Smilax gracilior Ferrufino & Greuter
 Smilax griffithii A.DC.
 Smilax guianensis Vitman
 Smilax guiyangensis C.X.Fu & C.D.Shen
 Smilax havanensis Jacq.
 Smilax hayatae T.Koyama
 Smilax hemsleyana Craib.
 Smilax herbacea L. – smooth herbaceous greenbrier, carrion flower (southern Quebec in Canada, Eastern United States)
 Smilax hilariana A.DC. 
 Smilax horridiramula Hayata
 Smilax hugeri (Small) J.B.Norton ex Pennell
 Smilax hypoglauca Benth.
 Smilax ilicifolia Desv. ex Ham.
 Smilax illinoensis Mangaly – Illinois greenbrier
 Smilax indosinica T.Koyama
 Smilax inversa T.Koyama
 Smilax irrorata Mart. ex Griseb. 
 Smilax jamesii G.Wallace
 Smilax japicanga Griseb. 
 Smilax javensis A.DC. 
 Smilax kaniensis K.Krause
 Smilax keyensis Warb. ex K.Krause
 Smilax kingii Hook.f.
 Smilax klotzschii Kunth
 Smilax korthalsii A.DC. 
 Smilax kwangsiensis F.T.Wang & Tang
 Smilax lanceifolia Roxb.
 Smilax lappacea Humb. & Bonpl. ex Willd.
 Smilax larvata Griseb. 
 Smilax lasioneura Hook. – herbaceous greenbrier
 Smilax lasseriana Steyerm.
 Smilax laurifolia L.
 Smilax lebrunii H.Lév.
 Smilax leucophylla Blume
 Smilax ligneoriparia C.X.Fu & P.Li
 Smilax ligustrifolia A.DC. 
 Smilax loheri Merr
 Smilax longifolia Rich.
 Smilax lucidaMerr.
 Smilax luei T.Koyama
 Smilax lunglingensis F.T.Wang & Tang
 Smilax lushuiensis S.C.Chen
 Smilax lutescens Vell.
 Smilax luzonensis Presl
 Smilax macrocarpa Blume
 Smilax magnifolia J.F.Macbr.
 Smilax mairei Lev.
 Smilax malipoensis S.C.Chen
 Smilax maritima Feay ex Alph.Wood
 Smilax maypurensis Humb. & Bonpl. ex Willd.
 Smilax megacarpa A.DC.
 Smilax megalantha C.H.Wright
 Smilax melanocarpa Ridl.
 Smilax melastomifolia Sm. – hoi kuahiwi (Hawaii)
 Smilax menispermoidea A.DC.
 Smilax microchina T.Koyama
 Smilax microphylla C.H.Wright
 Smilax minarum A.DC. 
 Smilax minutiflora A.DC.
 Smilax modesta A.DC. 
 Smilax mollis Humb. & Bonpl. ex Willd.
 Smilax moranensis Mart. & Galeotti
 Smilax munita S.C.Chen
 Smilax muscosa Toledo
 Smilax myosotiflora A.DC.
 Smilax myrtillus A.DC.
 Smilax nageliana A.DC. 
 Smilax nana F.T.Wang
 Smilax nantoensis T.Koyama
 Smilax neocaledonica Schltr
 Smilax nervomarginata Hayata
 Smilax nigrescens F.T.Wang & Tang
 Smilax nipponica Miq.
 Smilax nova-guineensis T.Koyama
 Smilax obliquata Duhamel
 Smilax oblongata Sw.
 Smilax ocreata DC.
 Smilax odoratissima Blume
 Smilax officinalis Kunth 
 Smilax orbiculata Labill.
 Smilax ornata Lem.
 Smilax orthoptera A.DC. 
 Smilax outanscianensis Pamp.
 Smilax ovalifolia Roxb.
 Smilax ovatolanceolata T.Koyama
 Smilax pachysandroides T.Koyama
 Smilax paniculata M.Martens & Galeotti
 Smilax papuana Lauterb.
 Smilax perfoliata Lour.
 Smilax petelotii T.Koyama
 Smilax pilcomayensis Guagl. & S.Gattuso
 Smilax pilosa Andreata & Leoni
 Smilax pinfaensis H.Lév. & Vaniot 
 Smilax plurifurcata A.DC. 
 Smilax poilanei Gagnep.
 Smilax polyacantha Wall. ex Kunth
 Smilax polycolea Warb.
 Smilax populnea Kunth
 Smilax pottingeri Prain
 Smilax pseudochina L. - false chinaroot
 Smilax pulverulenta Michx.
 Smilax pumila Walter
 Smilax purhampuy Ruiz
 Smilax purpurata G.Forst.
 Smilax pygmaea Merr.
 Smilax quadrata A.DC. 
 Smilax quadrumbellata T.Koyama
 Smilax quinquenervia Vell.
 Smilax remotinervis Hand.-Mazz.
 Smilax retroflexa (F.T.Wang & Tang) S.C.Chen
 Smilax riparia A.DC.
 Smilax rotundifolia L. - common greenbrier (Eastern United States)
 Smilax rubromarginata K.Krause
 Smilax rufescens Griseb. 
 Smilax ruiziana Kunth
 Smilax salicifolia Griseb. 
 Smilax sanguinea Posada-Ar.
 Smilax santaremensis A.DC. 
 Smilax saulensis J.D.Mitch.
 Smilax schomburgkiana Kunth
 Smilax scobinicaulis C.H.Wright
 Smilax sebeana Miq.
 Smilax setiramula F.T.Wang & Tang
 Smilax setosa Miq.
 Smilax sieboldii Miq.
 Smilax sinclairii T.Koyama
 Smilax siphilitica Humb. & Bonpl. ex Willd.
 Smilax solanifolia A.DC. 
 Smilax spicata Vell.
 Smilax spinosa Mill.
 Smilax spissa Killip & C.V.Morton
 Smilax spruceana A.DC.
 Smilax stans Maxim.
 Smilax stenophylla A.DC. 
 Smilax subinermis C.Presl
 Smilax subpubescens A.DC. 
 Smilax subsessiliflora Poir.
 Smilax synandra Gagnep.
 Smilax talbotiana A.DC. 
 Smilax tamnoides L. - halberd-leaved greenbrier
 Smilax tetraptera Schltr
 Smilax timorensis A.DC. 
 Smilax tomentosa Kunth 
 Smilax trachypoda J.B.Norton 
 Smilax trinervula Miq.
 Smilax tsinchengshanensis F.T.Wang
 Smilax tuberculata C.Presl
 Smilax turbans F.T.Wang & Tang
 Smilax utilis C.H.Wright
 Smilax vaginata Decne. 
 Smilax vanchingshanensis (F.T.Wang & Tang) F.T.Wang & Tang
 Smilax velutina Killip & C.V.Morton
 Smilax verrucosa Griseb. 
 Smilax verticalis Gagnep.
 Smilax vitiensis (Seem.) A.DC. 
 Smilax wallichii Kunth
 Smilax walteri Pursh.
 Smilax wightii A.DC. 
 Smilax williamsii Merr.
 Smilax yunnanensis S.C.Chen
 Smilax zeylanica L.

Distribution and habitat 

Pantropical, extending into adjacent temperate zones to north and south. 29 species are recognized in Central America and the Caribbean.

Ecology 

The berry is rubbery in texture and has a large, spherical seed in the center. The fruit stays intact through winter, when birds and other animals eat them to survive. The seeds are passed unharmed in the animal's droppings. Since many Smilax colonies are single clones that have spread by rhizomes, both sexes may not be present at a site, in which case no fruit is formed.

Smilax is a very damage-tolerant plant capable of growing back from its rhizomes after being cut down or burned down by fire. This, coupled with the fact that birds and other small animals spread the seeds over large areas, makes the plants very hard to get rid of. It grows best in moist woodlands with a soil pH between 5 and 6. The seeds have the greatest chance of germinating after being exposed to a freeze.

Besides their berries providing an important food for birds and other animals during the winter, greenbrier plants also provide shelter for many other animals. The thorny thickets can effectively protect small animals from larger predators who cannot enter the prickly tangle. Deer and other herbivorous mammals will eat the foliage, as will some invertebrates such as Lepidoptera (butterflies and moths), which also often drink nectar from the flowers. Beetles too are known to consume leaves.

Among the Lepidoptera utilizing Smilax are Hesperiidae like the water snow flat (Tagiades litigiosa), Pieridae like the small grass yellow (Eurema smilax), or moths like the peculiar and sometimes flightless genus Thyrocopa. But particularly fond of greenbriers are certain Nymphalidae caterpillars, for example those of:
 Faunis – faun butterflies
 Kaniska canace – blue admiral (on China smilax, S. china)
 Phalanta phalantha – common leopard (on S. tetragona)

Uses 

An extract from the roots of some species – most significantly Jamaican sarsaparilla (S. ornata) – is used to make the sarsaparilla drink and other root beers, as well as herbal drinks like the popular Baba Roots from Jamaica. Two species, S. domingensis and S. havanensis, are used in a traditional soda-like Cuban beverage called pru. The roots may also be used in soups or stews. The young shoots can be eaten raw or cooked and are said to taste like asparagus, and the berries can be eaten both raw and cooked. Stuffed smilax pancake, or fúlíng jiābǐng, is a traditional snack from the Beijing region. S. glabra is used in Chinese herbology. It is also a key ingredient in the Chinese medical dessert guīlínggāo, which makes use of its property to set certain kinds of jelly.

The powdered roots of Jamaican sarsaparilla are known as Rad. Sarzae. Jam. in pharmacy and are used as a traditional medicine for gout in Latin American countries. Köhler's Medicinal Plants of 1887 discusses the American sarsaparilla (S. aristolochiifolia), but as early as about 1569, in his treatise devoted to syphilis, the Persian scholar Imad al-Din Mahmud ibn Mas‘ud Shirazi gave a detailed evaluation of the medical properties of chinaroot.

Diosgenin, a steroidal sapogenin, is reported from S. menispermoidea. Other active compounds reported from various greenbrier species are parillin (also sarsaparillin or smilacin), sarsapic acid, sarsapogenin and sarsaponin.

Due to the nectar-rich flowers, species like S. medica and S. officinalis are also useful honey plants.

The common floral decoration smilax is Asparagus asparagoides.

Gallery

Notes

References

Bibliography 

 
 
 Mifsud, Stephen (2002): Wild Plants of Malta & Gozo – Mediterranean Smilax. Retrieved October 2, 2008.

External links
 
 

Smilacaceae
Liliales genera
Root vegetables
Stem vegetables
Dioecious plants

ne:कुकुरडाइनो